Le Roi des Champs-Élysées is a 1934 French comedy starring Buster Keaton. This French-made film has Keaton playing two roles, as an aspiring actor, and as an American gangster. A closing gag has the typically deadpan Keaton breaking out into a big grin after being kissed.

Most all of Keaton's dialogue, in French, is dubbed.  The film was never theatrically released in the United States.

See also 
 1934 in film

External links

 Le Roi des Champs-Élysées at the International Buster Keaton Society

1934 films
1934 comedy films
French comedy films
1930s French-language films
Films directed by Max Nosseck
French black-and-white films
Films set in Paris
1930s French films